Aalaap Raju (born 6 June 1979) is a playback singer and a bass guitar player from Chennai, India. His rendition of Enamo Aedho from the movie Ko composed by Harris Jayaraj topped the music charts for several months in 2011 and won him the Filmfare Award for Best Male Playback Singer – 2011. He has sung for music directors like Harris Jayaraj, Thaman, G.V Prakash, Deepak Dev, D.Imman, Sreekanth Deva and many more. His other noticeable songs include Vaaya moodi summa iru da from Mugamoodi, Engeyum Kadhal from Engeyum Kadhal, Endhan Kann Munnae from Nanban, Kadhal Oru Butterfly and Akila Akila from Oru Kal Oru Kannadi, Anjana Anjana from Vandhan Vendran, Kuthu Kuthu from Ayyanar, Nenjodu Cherthu from Yuvvh, Theeyae Theeyae from Maattrraan, Jal Jal Osai from Manam Kothi Paravai, and Maya Bazaar from Ennai Arindhaal.

He is also a well-known bass guitar player, have collaborated for all top composers in Kollywood, Mollywood and all the way to Bollywood. His noticeable Bollywood collaboration was with Shankar–Ehsaan–Loy for the movie Raazi He had played bass guitar for the only track in the album called ‘Dilbaro’ . He has played more than 500 Live gigs including commercial film, fusion and TV shows.

Early life
Music was something that was natural to him since he hails from a musical family. His parents, J. M. Raju and Latha Raju, are playback singers in Malayalam while his grandmother, late Smt. Santha P. Nair and grandfather, late K. Padmanabhan Nair were well known names in the Malayalam music industry in 60s and 70s. Though in his school days he wanted to become a professional cricketer and represent India in the International level, his under graduation days at SVCE (Chennai) had other plans for him. His college mates inspired him to take up singing and bass guitar in parallel in his last year. Months of practice made Aalaap a self-taught musician in playing bass guitar and singing, Aalaap's name spread through the most prestigious cultural events in India especially 'Saarang' (hosted by Indian Institute of Technology (IIT), Chennai) where he was awarded 'Best Instrumentalist' for his bass guitar playing.  And that was the starting point of numerous recording sessions and live performances in India and abroad. His singing took more prominence once Ennamo Yedho and Engeyum Kadhal released in 2011, composed by Harris Jayaraj. Aalaap now concentrates on singing and bass guitar playing equally in studios and live.

Career
As a singer and bass guitar player, Aalaap has performed with several prominent artists such as Dr. T.V. Gopalakrishnan, Dr. L. Subramaniam, Frank Dubier, etc., and has recorded with noticeable composers such as Ilayaraja, Harris Jayaraj, Shankar Ehsaan Loy, Mani Sarma, G.V Prakash, Thaman, Deepak Dev etc. 

He has been part of the prestigious Europalia Festival '13 (hosted by ICCR India: Indian Council for Cultural Relations), as a bass guitar player for Dr. L. Subramaniam covering countries like Italy, Netherlands, Belgium, Spain, Russia, Sweden, Latvia and Iceland.

Aalaap was part of a Neo-Carnatic-Funk band called Project YUJ, a four piece line up composed of electric mandolin, electric bass guitar, keyboards and acoustic drums. Yuj, a Sanskrit word that means to join or to concentrate, is indicative of the group's manifesto – to bring out and fuse its multitude of influences into a whole that is greater than the sum of its parts. The group members' diverse musical backgrounds and formidable chops allow for flights of improvisational freedom and virtuosity while still maintaining accessibility and musicality. At present, there are not many groups in India that are really trying to improvise and authentically fuse all of these disparate styles while staying true to the vital aspects of each. Project YUJ fills that space!

He was also part of a duo multi-genre band called Rahlaap along with playback singer Rahul Nambiar. Rahlaap has released their self-titled multi-genre album. Available in music portals like iTunes, Amazon, Hummaa, etc.

Aalaap is now an active member of bands like MAKKA (feat. Playback singers Ranjith Govind and Rahul Nambiar), his own line up called Aalaap Raju & Band (ArB) and Sean Roldan & Friends.

Awards
 Filmfare Award for Best Male Playback Singer - Tamil – "Enamo Aedho" for Ko
 Edison Award for Best Male Playback Singer – "Enamo Aedho" for Ko
 Vijay Award for Song of the Year (for Enamo Aedho) – 2011
 Radio Mirchi Award for Song of the Year (for Enamo Aedho) – 2011
 Edison Award for Best Singer – 2011
 Chennai Times Award for Best Singer – 2011
 Screen Moon Award for Best Singer – 2011
 Kannadasan Award for Best Debutant Singer – 2011
 Big FM Rising Star Award for Best Singer – 2011
 Jaya Award for Best Debutant Singer – 2011
 V4 Shivaji – MGR Award for Best Singer – 2011
 Big FM Best Melody Singer Award – Tamil – 2013
 Big FM Best Melody Singer Award (Independent Music) – Malayalam – 2013

Discography

References

External links
 
 
 
 
 
 

1979 births
Living people
Malayalam playback singers
Tamil playback singers
Telugu playback singers
Indian male playback singers